Merenius is a genus of corinnid sac spiders first described by Eugène Simon in 1910.

Species
 it contains twelve species:
Merenius alberti Lessert, 1923 – Southern Africa
Merenius concolor Caporiacco, 1947 – Tanzania
Merenius myrmex Simon, 1910 – Guinea-Bissau
Merenius plumosus Simon, 1910 (type) – Guinea-Bissau
Merenius proximus Lessert, 1929 – Congo
Merenius p. quadrimaculatus Lessert, 1946 – Congo
Merenius recurvatus (Strand, 1906) – Ethiopia, East Africa
Merenius secundus (Strand, 1907) – Tanzania
Merenius simoni Lessert, 1921 – Congo, East Africa
Merenius solitarius Lessert, 1946 – Congo
Merenius tenuiculus Simon, 1910 – Sierra Leone
Merenius yemenensis Denis, 1953 – Yemen

References

Araneomorphae genera
Corinnidae
Spiders of Africa
Taxa named by Eugène Simon